Plectromerus tertiarius is an extinct species of beetle in the family Cerambycidae.

It was first described by Vitali in 2005.

Prehistoric specimens were found in Dominican amber on Hispaniola in the Caribbean.

References

†
Prehistoric beetles
†
Burdigalian life
Neogene Dominican Republic
Miocene insects of North America
Prehistoric insects of the Caribbean
†
†
Fossils of the Dominican Republic
Dominican amber
Fossil taxa described in 2005